The 2016 Spokane Empire season was the eleventh season for the professional indoor football franchise and first in the Indoor Football League (IFL). One of ten teams that compete in the IFL for the 2016 season and members of the Intense Conference.

Led by head coach Adam Shackleford, the Empire play their home games at the Spokane Veterans Memorial Arena in Spokane, Washington.

Schedule
Key:

Regular season
All start times are local time

Standings

Postseason

Roster

References

External links
Spokane Empire official website
Spokane Empire official statistics 
Spokane Empire at The Spokesman-Review

Spokane Empire
Spokane Empire
Spokane Empire